Ben Richards (born 1964) is a British screenwriter and novelist. He has been the lead writer on Spooks and is the writer/creator of Party Animals, Outcasts, COBRA and Showtrial. He also created “The Tunnel” from the Scandinavian original of “The Bridge” as well as adapting “The Cuckoo’s Calling”, the first in Robert Galbraith’s “Strike” series for BBC1.

Career
Before writing novels and TV dramas, he worked for three years as a housing officer in Newham and Islington, London. As a research student at UCL's Department of Geography he spent a year investigating public housing in Chile and on his return to Britain began his first novel "to alleviate the boredom of analysing questionnaires" for his PhD thesis. Richards was a lecturer at the University of Birmingham and at University College London, where he taught development studies, specialising in South America. He is now a full-time writer.

His novels are Throwing the House out of the Window (1996), Don't Step on the Lines (1997), The Silver River (1999), A Sweetheart Deal (2001), The Mermaid and the Drunks (2004) and Confidence (2006).  He also contributed to the New Puritans anthology of 2000.

As a screenwriter, Richards has written for the BBC (Spooks and Party Animals), ITV (The Fixer) and Channel 4 (No Angels). He has also written for the British/French crime drama television series The Tunnel.

Writing credits

References

External links
3am interview
 

1964 births
Living people
Academics of the University of Birmingham
21st-century English novelists
English male novelists
English screenwriters
English male screenwriters
British television writers
British science fiction writers
English television writers
British male television writers
21st-century British screenwriters
21st-century English male writers